The action of 10 May 1915 was a naval encounter between the Russian pre-dreadnought squadron and the Ottoman battlecruiser Yavuz Sultan Selim  in the Black Sea. After a brief exchange of fire the Ottomans withdrew.

Background
On 9 May 1915, a Russian squadron attacked Ottoman shipping between Kozlu and Eregli, sinking four steamers and many sailing ships. The battlecruiser Yavuz Sultan Selim, under Captain Richard Ackermann, immediately put to sea in order to intercept the Russians. Early on the morning of 10 May, a bombardment force detached from the Russian squadron in order to attack the Bosphorus forts. This consisted of the obsolete pre-dreadnoughts  and  Panteleimon, the seaplane carriers Almaz and Imperator Alexander I, as well as a screen of destroyers and minesweepers.

Battle
The Ottoman destroyer , acting as a guard ship at the mouth of the Bosphorus, sighted the bombardment force and radioed a warning to Yavuz. The destroyer proceeded to engage the minesweepers but was forced to withdraw under heavy fire from the battleships. The protected cruiser  then spotted Yavuz and reported it to the fleet, giving the bombardment force time to break off before it was sighted.

Ackermann was unaware of this, and ran right into the squadron.

At 07:53 hours, Eberhardt's force met Yavuz sailing along a parallel course. Ackermann believed this to be the bombardment detail, though he was confused as to why he was facing three battleships instead of two. He soon realized his mistake when Tri Sviatitelia and Panteleimon joined the Russian battle line. The Ottoman battlecruiser fired 160  shells in the ensuing engagement, but scored no hits and caused no damage. One near miss on Evstafi sent a cascade of water over the flying bridge, drenching Admiral Eberhardt and his staff. In return, the Russians landed one heavy caliber shell on Yavuzs forecastle, and another on her forward armoured belt. Outnumbered and outgunned, Captain Ackermann ordered his ship to disengage at 08:12. The Russians pursued the battlecruiser to the north before it doubled back and returned to Ottoman waters.

Aftermath
Though the Ottomans had been forced to retreat, the damaged they suffered was minimal and they disrupted the Russians' planned bombardment in the Bosphorus. The action also made the Russians more wary about dividing their pre-dreadnought squadron.

References

Naval battles of World War I involving Russia
Naval battles of World War I involving the Ottoman Empire
Black Sea naval operations of World War I
Conflicts in 1915
May 1915 events